Tremulous is the second studio album by the San Francisco based punk band Western Addiction. The album was released by Fat Wreck Chords in March 2017, more than 10 years after their debut album Cognicide in 2005. It was produced by Joey Cape of Lagwagon and Me First and the Gimme Gimmes. The artwork was done by Belgian artist Thierry De Cordier.

Track listing 
 "Clatter and Hiss" – 2:39
 "Family of Boys" – 1:39
 "Masscult, Vulgarians and Entitlement" – 2:25
 "Taedium" – 3:13
 "Ditch Riders" – 3:12
 "Honeycreeper" – 3:01
 "Righteous Lightning" – 3:30
 "Red Emeralds" – 1:46
 "Humming Bars of White Light" – 2:17
 "The Rockery" – 2:50
 "Your Life is Precious" – 5:34

Performers 

 Tyson Annicharico – bass
 Chad Williams – drums, keyboards
 Ken Yamazaki – guitar, background vocals
 Tony Teixeira – guitar, background vocals
 Jason Hall – vocals
 Joey Cape - keyboards, background vocals, engineer, producer
 Todd Kowalski - vocals on "Taedium"

References 

2017 albums
Fat Wreck Chords albums
Western Addiction albums